National Council for Tibb is a body corporate, established under section 3 of The Unani, Ayurvedic and Homoeopathic Practitioners Act, 1965, to promote the Unani, Ayurvedic and Homoeopathic system of medicine. It is responsible for developing curriculum, education and examination of Tibb-e-Unani and Ayurveda and for registration of Tabibs/Hakims and Vaids who passed the examination.

National Council for Tibb is recognized by the Higher Education Commission of Pakistan as an accreditation council of Pakistan.

References

Medical education in Pakistan
Ayurvedic organisations
Unani medicine organisations